"Love Potion No. 9" is a song written in 1959 by Jerry Leiber and Mike Stoller. It was originally performed by the Clovers, who took it to number 23 on the US as well as R&B charts that year.

The song was recorded by the Searchers in 1964.  Their version reached number three on the U.S. Billboard Hot 100 and number two on Cash Box during the winter of 1965.

Herb Alpert and The Tijuana Brass did an instrumental version (side 2, track 1) on his 1965 album Whipped Cream and Other Delights.

The Coasters released a version in December 1971 with "D. W. Washburn" on the B-side. It reached No. 76 on the Billboard Pop chart and No. 96 on the Cash Box chart.

History
The song describes a man seeking help to find love. He enlists the help of a gypsy who determines, by means of palmistry, that he needs "love potion number nine." The potion, an aphrodisiac, causes him to fall in love with everything he sees, kissing whatever is in front of him, eventually kissing a policeman on the street corner, who breaks his bottle of love potion.

In LP release, at the ending of the song the Clovers used the alternative lyrics:

I had so much fun that I'm going back again,
I wonder what'll happen with Love Potion Number Ten?

This version was used in the film American Graffiti and released on the LP version of the soundtrack, but replaced by the single version on the CD release.  

The song was the basic premise of the 1992 film of the same name starring Sandra Bullock and Tate Donovan.

Charts

Later versions
The heavy metal band Tygers of Pan Tang recorded "Love Potion No. 9" in 1982.  Their version charted in the UK, reaching No. 45 in 1982. The White Stripes covered the song live at the Gold Dollar in Detroit, Michigan, on July 14, 1997, including the alternative ending lyrics; this version was released in 2012 on the EP "Live On Bastille Day". In 2016 the song was performed by John Cooper Clarke and Hugh Cornwell for BBC 6 Music Live. The song was released as a single by indie rock band The Wallies in November 2019; it has also been covered by punk rock group The Queers on their 2021 album Reverberation.

Rockapella also covered the song.

References

External links

1959 singles
1963 singles
Songs written by Jerry Leiber and Mike Stoller
The Clovers songs
The Coasters songs
The Searchers (band) songs
Herb Alpert songs
The Ventures songs
Neil Diamond songs
The White Stripes songs
Gary Lewis & the Playboys songs
United Artists Records singles
Pye Records singles
1959 songs